Singles and full albums of original music for The Smurfs cartoon series (1981–1989) and the Smurfs movies have been released in different countries and languages, sometimes very successfully, with millions of copies sold. Worldwide, more than 10 million CDs were sold between 2005 and 2007 alone.

Music recordings 
In general, there have been three eras in which Smurf music was very popular: the late 1970s, the early 1980s and the mid-1990s and later.

The first successful Smurf record was The Smurf Song (originally titled Het Smurfenlied in Dutch) by Dutch singer, writer and producer Pierre Kartner, a.k.a. Father Abraham. The single, first released in November 1977, reached the #1 position in 16 countries. (While held off the top spot in the UK by "You're The One That I Want", the single broke a record for most consecutive weeks at number two, which was only equaled in 1991 by Right Said Fred's "I'm Too Sexy" and finally beaten in 1994 when All 4 One achieved 7 weeks at No.2 with "I Swear") Kartner subsequently recorded different versions of the song in different languages and he made an album, Father Abraham in Smurfland, which was also a success. It sold 200,000 copies in Belgium and 300,000 copies in Netherlands. 

As work on a second Smurf album stalled during 1979 due to creative differences between Mr Kartner and his Dutch record company Dureco, the latter – which owned the music rights to the Smurfs output – decided to take matter into own hands and started producing its own Smurf-related records, produced by music promoter Frans Erkelens and composer Barrie Corbett (who had a European hit in 1975 with If You Go as half of the duo Barry & Eileen). Together, they produced numerous Smurf albums, some of which coincided with the Hanna-Barbera cartoon series which was produced in the early 1980s. Again, many of these albums were released in different languages. In 1984, the album Best of Friends by The Smurfs – produced for the American market – received a nomination for a Grammy Award for Best Album for Children.

The third wave of Smurf mania occurred in the second half of the 1990s, and again it had a Dutch link. This time it was Dutch production team Cat Music who were asked by EMI Music in the Netherlands to produce a Smurf album with "smurfed up" versions of current hits. The first single was a new version of the 2 Unlimited hit No Limit, which went to Number One in the Netherlands in early 1995. Local branches of EMI in Europe requested their own Smurf albums (see below), all produced by Cat Music and mostly sung by local (uncredited) artists.

Czech Republic 
There are some Smurf records released in Czech Republic. The first releases was released in 1988 and 1989, followed by 1996 to 2000, and again in 2011 and 2012. One of the albums, which was released in 1996, is the best selling album ever in Czech Republic between 1994 and 2006.

Finland 
Since 1996, EMI Finland has released a total of 19 Smurf CDs (mostly featuring "smurfy" versions of pop hits). The first of them sold 170,000 copies in Finland. One album has sold multi-platinum, one album has sold double-platinum, eight albums have sold platinum, five albums have sold gold and one single has sold gold. The total of their certified sales exceeds 800,000 copies.

Germany 
Since the 1970s, many Smurf records have been made in Germany, some of them turning out to be bestsellers.  This started with the Father Abraham single Das Lied der Schlümpfe and the album Vater Abraham im Land der Schlümpfe, both of which went platinum. Apart from many later gold records, the Smurfs again were certificated platinum for the 1981 album Hitparade der Schlümpfe, the 1995 albumTekkno ist cool (double platinum) and the 1996 Alles Banane volume 3, Megaparty volume 2 and Voll der Winter volume 4.

Hungary 
From 1996 to 2011, fourteen "Hupikék Törpikék" (the Hungarian name for "The Smurfs") albums were released.  The songs on these albums are covers of popular songs, sang in Hungarian, with lyrics related to the cartoon "The Smurfs".

Italy 
In Italy, most of the Smurfs cartoon anthems were sung by Cristina D'Avena.

Japan 
In Japan,  was the opening theme song to the Japanese dub of the Smurfs television series. It was released on 45 vinyl by Polydor Records in 1981 exclusively in Japan. Included on the back of the album were dancing instructions for a special Smurf dance.

Netherlands 
The success of the Smurfs music in the Netherlands started with the Dutch artist Father Abraham, whose single  't Smurfenlied (The Smurf Song) stayed at the number 1 position on the Dutch charts for seven consecutive weeks, and the follow-up single Smurfenbier reached #5. More Smurf records followed in the decades, with Irene Moors as one of the main artists. In 1995, three different Smurf albums went platinum, with Smurf the House, Smurfen Houseparty, and the double platinum Ga je mee naar Smurfenland. The single No Limit, based on the 2 Unlimited hit No Limit, also went platinum and topped the Dutch charts for six weeks in 1995.

Norway 
In 1978, actor/comedian Geir Børresen recorded a Norwegian version of Father Abraham's "The Smurf Song", which went on to top the Norwegian singles lists for 7 weeks in 1978/79. The accompanying album, "I Smurfeland" became even more popular, for a long time the best-selling Norwegian album of all time (270,000 copies sold in Norway.) until overtaken by Åge Aleksandersen's "Levva Livet" in 1984. There were also two sequel albums released throughout 1979, and those three albums sold a total of 380,000 copies. One of his albums has a song done to the tune of the Silly Song from Snow White and the Seven Dwarfs (1937 film), and even has the same title, Tullesang.

Poland 
Since 1997, 13 Smurf albums called Smerfne Hity were released in Poland. The first album, released in 1997, sold quadruple-platinum and four others sold platinum. In the first four years, during which nine albums have been released, their sales exceeded 1,160,000 copies.

United Kingdom 
In the UK the Smurfs have had five Top 20 singles. The first was the #2 "The Smurf Song" in June 1978, followed by the #13 and #19 hits "Dippety Day" and "Christmas in Smurfland" in September and December of the same year. Eighteen years later they scored two Top 10 hits with "I've Got A Little Puppy" (#4) and "Your Christmas Wish" (#8) in September and December 1996. Their #4 hit was unusual in that it used the music of the song "I Want To Be A Hippy" by Technohead, the original having lyrics about drug usage and rave music.

In terms of albums they have had six Top 30 hits. The first, in November 1978 was Father Abraham in Smurfland which reached #19. After a wait for 18 years they had two Top 10's in 1996, The Smurfs Go Pop! (July, #2) and Smurf's Christmas Party (November, #8). February 1997 saw another #2 hit The Smurfs Hits '97 – Volume 1 and seven months later came a #15, Go Pop! Again. A greatest hits album in April 1998 broke into the Top 30 at #28.

The Smurf dance 
The Smurf is a dance that originated with the Hanna-Barbera cartoon.

The Smurf is mentioned in "The Frug", a song by the band Rilo Kiley. It appeared on both their debut album, The Initial Friend E.P., and on the soundtrack to the movie Desert Blue. The Smurf is also mentioned in "The New Style" and "Posse In Effect", songs by the band Beastie Boys on their album "Licensed to Ill"; in "Turn Me Loose" as recorded by the collaboration of Eminem and Limp Bizkit; and in the song "I'm Through With White Girls" written by Jim Diamond and recorded by the band The Dirtbombs.  The rapper Nas referenced The Smurf in the song Made You Look, along with two other fad dances, (the Wop and the Baseball bat). That same Nas line was used in the song "88" by the rap duo The Cool Kids, which is also featured on the video game NBA Live 08. The band Flobots mentions the Smurf in their song "The Effect."

Parodies 
 Comedy Band The Barron Knights' 1978 UK #3 hit single A Taste Of Aggro, a medley of parodies, included a version of The Smurf Song featuring, in place of the Smurfs, a group of bank robbers from Catford who have escaped from Dartmoor Prison.
 In 1979 the pop impresario Jonathan King scored a minor hit single under the pseudonym Father Abraphart and the Smurps entitled 'Lick a Smurp for Christmas (All Fall Down)', a parody of Father Abraham and the Smurfs. The title of the song referred to the hoax story that some Smurfs toys had been painted using lead paint, and that young children had been falling ill from placing them in their mouths.
 Oasis refused permission for the release of the song "Wondersmurf", a parody of their song "Wonderwall."

Notes

External links 

 The Smurfs official site
 Happy Smurfday: Official Smurfs 50th Anniversary site

 
Novelty and fad dances
Songs about fictional characters
Songs about comics